Richard  Wingfield (died c. 1591), of Wantisden and Crowfield, Suffolk, was an English politician.

He was a Member (MP) of the Parliament of England for Orford in 1559. He may also have held this seat in 1586 and 1589. He had lands in Derbyshire, Herefordshire, Staffordshire, Warwickshire and Worcestershire.

References

Year of birth missing
1591 deaths
English MPs 1559
Richard
Politicians from Suffolk
People from Orford, Suffolk